Travelers Rest High School is a public high school in Travelers Rest, South Carolina. The school is an International Baccalaureate school.

The old Travelers Rest high school building was used in the 2008 film Leatherheads, starring George Clooney.

References 

Public high schools in South Carolina
International Baccalaureate schools in South Carolina
Schools in Greenville County, South Carolina